David Jacks (born 24 May 1948) is  a former Australian rules footballer who played with Richmond in the Victorian Football League (VFL).

Notes

External links 

Living people
1948 births
Australian rules footballers from Victoria (Australia)
Richmond Football Club players